Perilous Journey is a 1977 studio album by guitarist Gordon Giltrap.

The album was remixed and re-released in 1998.

Reception 
AllMusic awarded the album with 2.5 stars and its review by Stewart Mason states: "Part of a trilogy of mid-'70s releases that presents a much different side of the folk-based guitarist Gordon Giltrap, 1977's Perilous Journey is a strictly instrumental album recorded with an enormous cadre of friends and studio musicians".

Track listing
All music composed by Gordon Giltrap

Side one

Side two

Personnel
Gordon Giltrap - guitars
Rod Edwards - keyboards
John G. Perry - bass
Simon Phillips - drums
with:
Tony Carr - percussion
Rod Edwards - additional keyboards
Roger Ball - alto saxophone on "The Deserter" and "Morbio Gorge"
Malcolm Duncan - tenor saxophone on "Morbio Gorge"
Stan Sulzmann - tenor saxophone
Jeff Daly - baritone saxophone
Henry Lowther, Martin Drover - trumpet
Chris Pyne - trombone
Patrick Halling - strings leader
Technical
Roger T. Wake - engineer
Jean Luke Epstein - art direction, illustration

References

External links
"Gordon Giltrap website"

1977 albums
Gordon Giltrap albums